Atlin Water Aerodrome  is located on Atlin Lake adjacent to Atlin, British Columbia, Canada.

The airport is classified as an airport of entry by Nav Canada and is staffed by the Canada Border Services Agency (CBSA). CBSA officers at this airport can handle general aviation aircraft only, with no more than 15 passengers.

See also
Atlin Airport

References

Seaplane bases in British Columbia
Atlin District
Registered aerodromes in British Columbia